The Louisville Shooting Stars were a minor league professional ice hockey team that played in the International Hockey League during the 1953–54 season. The Shooting Stars were based in Louisville, Kentucky and played at the Louisville Gardens.

Season-by-season results

See also
 Sports in Louisville, Kentucky

External links
 1953–54 statistics

Defunct sports teams in Louisville, Kentucky
International Hockey League (1945–2001) teams
Defunct ice hockey teams in the United States
Ice hockey clubs established in 1953
Ice hockey teams in Kentucky
Ice hockey clubs disestablished in 1954
1953 establishments in Kentucky
1954 disestablishments in Kentucky